Modern Love is an American romantic comedy anthology streaming television series developed by John Carney, based on the weekly column of the same name published by The New York Times, that premiered on Amazon Prime Video on October 18, 2019. In October 2019, the series was renewed for a second season, which was released on August 13, 2021.

Premise
Modern Love explores "love in its multitude of forms – including sexual, romantic, familial, platonic, and self love", which are presented in eight half-hour episodes. The Amazon series, based on the New York Times column of the same name, adapts different love stories taking place in New York City.

Cast and characters

Season 1

Episode 1
 Cristin Milioti as Maggie Mitchell
 Laurentiu Possa as Guzmin
 Brandon Victor Dixon as Daniel
 Daniel Reece as Mark
 Charles Warburton as Ted

Episode 2
 Catherine Keener as Julie
 Dev Patel as Joshua
 Caitlin McGee as Emma
 Erik Jensen as Darren
 Andy García as Michael

Episode 3
 Anne Hathaway as Lexi Donohoe
 Gary Carr as Jeff
 Quincy Tyler Bernstine as Sylvia
 Judd Hirsch as cop/vendor/taxi driver

Episode 4
 Tina Fey as Sarah
 John Slattery as Dennis
 Sarita Choudhury as therapist
 Aidan Fiske as Jack
 Arden Wolfe as Nancy

Episode 5
 Sofia Boutella as Yasmine
 John Gallagher Jr. as Rob

Episode 6
 Julia Garner as Madeline "Maddy"
 Shea Whigham as Peter
 Myha'la Herrold as Tami

Episode 7
 Andrew Scott as Tobin
 Brandon Kyle Goodman as Andy
 Olivia Cooke as Karla
 Ed Sheeran as Mick

Episode 8
 Jane Alexander as Margot
 James Saito as Kenji
 Peter Hermann as Philippe
 Petronia Paley as Janice
 James Waterston as Chris

Season 2

Episode 1
On a Serpentine Road, With the Top Down
 Minnie Driver as Stephanie Curran
 Tom Burke as Michael
 Don Wycherley as Neil

Episode 2
 Gbenga Akinnagbe as Jordan
 Zoë Chao as Zoe
 Aparna Nancherla as Vanessa

Episode 3
 Lucy Boynton as Paula
 Kit Harington as Michael
 Jack Reynor as Declan
 Miranda Richardson as Jane

Episode 4
 Dominique Fishback as Lil
 Isaac Powell as Vince
 Milan Ray as Lil (age 12)
 Pierson Salvador as Vince (age 12)

Episode 5
 Lulu Wilson as Katie
 Maria Dizzia as Lori
 Grace Edwards as Alexa
 Telci Huynh as Moush
 Linda Powell as Mrs. Vacher

Episode 6
 Garrett Hedlund as Spence
 Anna Paquin as Isabelle
 Ben Rappaport as Nick
 Jeena Yi as Jeannie
 Susan Blackwell as Allison

Episode 7
 Zane Pais as Robbie
 Marquis Rodriguez as Ben

Episode 8
 Sophie Okonedo as Elizabeth Cannon
 Tobias Menzies as Van
 Eileen Walsh as Lily De Courcy

Episodes

Season 1 (2019)

Season 2 (2021)

Production

Development
On June 11, 2018, it was announced that Amazon had given the production a series order for a first season consisting of eight episodes. The series was set to be directed, written, and produced by John Carney. Production companies involved with the series were slated to include Storied Media Group and The New York Times. On November 26, 2018, it was reported that Emmy Rossum, Sharon Horgan, and Tom Hall would serve as additional directors for the series. Horgan and Hall also wrote the episodes they were set to direct while Rossum was expected to direct an episode written by Audrey Wells. Additionally, it was further reported that Dimitri Hoffman, Sam Dolnick, and Choire Sicha would serve as executive producers, Trish Hofmann as a producer, and Daniel Jones as a consulting producer. On October 24, 2019, Amazon renewed the series for a second season which premiered on August 13, 2021.

Casting
On November 26, 2018, it was announced that Anne Hathaway, Tina Fey, Dev Patel, John Slattery, Brandon Victor Dixon, Catherine Keener, Julia Garner, Andy García, Cristin Milioti, Olivia Cooke, Andrew Scott, Shea Whigham, Gary Carr, Sofia Boutella, and John Gallagher Jr. had been cast in the first season.

In April 2020, it was revealed that Jesse Eisenberg has been cast in the second season.

In February 2021, the second season cast was announced, including Gbenga Akinnagbe, Lucy Boynton, Minnie Driver, Kit Harington, Garrett Hedlund, Anna Paquin, Jack Reynor and Miranda Richardson. In May 2021, Sophie Okonedo and Tobias Menzies joined the cast of second season.

Filming
Principal photography for the series had begun by September 18, 2018, in New York City. The second season was filmed in the New York cities of Schenectady, Albany, and Troy, as well as in Enniskerry and Stoneybatter, Dublin, Ireland.

International versions 
In April 2022, Prime Video announced the Indian version of the series in three different languages  Modern Love Mumbai in Hindi, Modern Love Hyderabad in Telugu and Modern Love Chennai in Tamil. A Japanese version of the series, titled Modern Love Tokyo has premiered worldwide on October 21, 2022. A Dutch version of the series, titled Modern Love Amsterdam premiered worldwide on December 16, 2022.

Reception

On Rotten Tomatoes it received an overall score of 66%, and an overall score of 65 on Metacritic.

Season 1
The first season held a 75% approval rating on Rotten Tomatoes based on 64 reviews, with an average rating of 6.6/10. The site's critical consensus read: "Carried by its charming cast, Modern Love sweet and simple sensibilities are easy enough to enjoy, even if its quaint portrait of modern life in New York City doesn't always ring true." On Metacritic, the first season received an average rating of 66 out of 100, based on 26 critics, indicating "generally favorable reviews".

Season 2
The second season held a 58% approval rating on Rotten Tomatoes based on 12 reviews, with an average rating of 5.7/10. The site's critical consensus read: "Modern Love struggles in its second season, favoring romantic clichés over the more complicated truths that make its source material so appealing - still, there's no denying the allure of its talented cast, which might be enough for some viewers." On Metacritic, the second season received an average rating of 61 out of 100, based on 8 critics, indicating "generally favorable reviews".

Accolades

References

External links
 

2010s American anthology television series
2010s American romantic comedy television series
2019 American television series debuts
2020s American anthology television series
2020s American romantic comedy television series
2021 American television series endings
Amazon Prime Video original programming
English-language television shows
Television series by Amazon Studios
Television shows filmed in New York (state)
Television shows set in New York City